Muhammad Hayyat al-Sindhi (died 3 February 1750) was an Islamic scholar who lived during the period of the Ottoman Empire.
He belonged to the Naqshbandi order of Sufism.

Education and scholarship
Al-Sindhi was born in modern day Pakistan, Sindh traveled locally to get his basic education.
Then he migrated to Madinah and studied closely with Ibrahim al-Kurani and his son Muhammaad Tahir al-Kurani. Here, he was initiated into the Naqshbandi tariqa.

Notable students

One of his students was Muhammad ibn Abd al-Wahhab, whom he met in 1136 Hijri. It was Abdullah ibn Ibrahim ibn Sayf who introduced him to Hayyat al-Sindhi. Sindhi would make an immense influence on the theological formation of Ibn 'Abd al-Wahhab and his reformist views. Early Wahhabi chroniclers acclaimed Al-Sindhi as “the spark that lighted ibn ʿAbdul Wahhab’s path".

Views

Although trained in Hanafi law, he was also a scholar of the Hanbali school. Al-Sindhi was a major reviver of hadith sciences during the 18th century. Throughout his treatises Sindhi stressed the obligation of upholding the practice of Ijtihad, condemned Taqlid, called for a revival of the doctrines of the Salaf al-Salih and championed the superiority of Hadiths over past juristic opinions. Al-Sindhi was also known for his strong critique of folk practices associated with cult of saints and veneration of shrines.

References

Sindhi people
18th-century Muslim scholars of Islam
Mujaddid
Muslim reformers
Sunni Muslim scholars of Islam
Naqshbandi order
Hadith scholars
Atharis
18th-century scholars
1750 deaths
Arab people of Sindhi descent
Sindhi scholars